Nevus comedonicus syndrome is a skin condition characterized by a nevus comedonicus associated with cataracts, scoliosis, and neurologic abnormalities.

See also 
 Epidermal nevus syndrome
 Cutaneous conditions

References

External links

Epidermal nevi, neoplasms, and cysts